Auglaize Township may refer to:

Missouri
 Auglaize Township, Camden County, Missouri
 Auglaize Township, Laclede County, Missouri

Ohio
 Auglaize Township, Allen County, Ohio
 Auglaize Township, Paulding County, Ohio

Township name disambiguation pages